Aroer is a biblical town on the north bank of the River Arnon to the east of the Dead Sea, in present-day Jordan. The town was an ancient Moabite settlement, and is mentioned in the Bible.

Aroer is identified with the modern village of 'Ara'ir in Jordan.

Aroer on the Arnon

Location
The city was still standing in the time of Eusebius. This place was usually described by its situation, in order to distinguish it from other localities of the same name.

Biblical mentions
It appears first as having been captured from Moab by the Amorite king Sihon. After the Israelite attack on the Amorites, it was assigned as part of the territory of the tribe of Reuben, whose southern frontier it marked. When Hazael of Aram Damascus took the Transjordan territory from the Kingdom of Israel, Aroer is given as its southern limit.

In , an Adadah is mentioned. According to Cheyne and Black, arguing partially on the basis of a Septuagint reading of Arouel, this Adadah may in fact be the result of a scribal error, with the text originally reading Ararah, meaning Aroer.

According to a prophecy in the Book of Isaiah, "the cities of Aroer" will become forsaken; however, the Septuagint relates this verse to Damascus in Syria, translating as "deserted for ever" (see Isaiah 17:2).

Archaeology
In the Mesha inscription, line 26, it is mentioned as having been built by the Moabites.

References and sources
References

Sources
 Aroer, Jewish Encyclopædia

External links
Photos of Ara'ir at the American Center of Research

Moab
Torah cities
Archaeological sites in Jordan